Gabriel López (born 17 March 1991) is a Venezuelan singer and television actor.

Biography
Gabriel was born in a family with a performing arts background. His father Diony López was an executive producer, singer and songwriter. He began his career at the age of 9 as the host of the kids TV show El Club Disney. His first acting role came at the age of 10 in the RCTV telenovela Trapos íntimos. He later went on to obtain roles in other RCTV telenovelas such as La cuaima, Amor a Palos and La trepadora.

In 2013, he obtained a co-starring role in the Venevisión telenovela De todas maneras Rosa. The telenovela provided a platform to enhance his singing career as he performed the theme song of the telenovela titled Locura de amor.

In 2015, he and his family  moved to the United States and he  starting working as an actor in Networks such as NBC Telemundo, Nickelodeon and several theatre productions as an actor and producer.

Telenovelas
2002: Trapos íntimos as Gabriel Pérez
2003: La cuaima as Coco O'Brian
2005: Amor a Palos as Romano Restrepo
2008: La Trepadora as Yosmir
2009: Libres como el viento as Andres
2011: El árbol de Gabriel as Saul Navas
2012: Mi ex me tiene ganas as Germán Zorrilla Franco
2013: De todas maneras Rosa as Reinaldo Bermúdez
2014: Nora as Guillermo
2015: Piel salvaje as Leandro López-Méndez
2017: Mariposa de barrio as Carlos
2017: Milagros de Navidad as Luca Ayala
2018: Sangre de mi Tierra as Rafael Zambrano
2019: Club 57 as Oso/Barba Negra

References

External links
 
  at 

1991 births
Living people
People from El Tigre
Venezuelan male telenovela actors
21st-century Venezuelan male actors
21st-century Venezuelan  male singers